Cardio-Vascular is an EP by British dance-punk band Youves. It was released in the spring of 2009 through Holy Roar Records. The album features mostly newly written material which was written between 2008 and 2009 as the band was going through a member  and name change; this being their first release under the name 'Youves'. The album has been released on compact disc and digital download.

Track listing
Fully Erect Serve and Protect
Aladdins Rave
Bigorexic
Another Djemba Djemba
Superstitious
My High Horse Is a Penny Farthing
On Probation

Personnel

 Stephen Broadley - Lead Vocals
 Alex Wiezak - Guitar and Backing Vocals
 Michael King - Guitar and Backing Vocals
 Luke Neale - Bass guitar
 Paul Wechter - Drums

References 

2009 EPs
Youves albums